The 1959 NCAA soccer season was the inaugural season of college soccer sanctioned by the NCAA. Including the history of the ISFA, this was the 56th season of organized men's collegiate soccer in the United States.

The season culminated with the 1959 NCAA Soccer Tournament, the first of the modern NCAA Division I Men's Soccer Tournament. The tournament was won by the Saint Louis Billikens, who defeated Bridgeport Purple Knights in the final, 5–2.

Regular season

Champions 
 California Intercollegiate Soccer Conference: San Francisco Community College
 New England Intercollegiate Soccer League: Bridgeport
 Ivy League: Harvard
 Metropolitan Intercollegiate Soccer Conference: Pratt
 Atlantic Coast Conference: Maryland
 New York State Athletic Conference: Cortland
 Rocky Mountain Intercollegiate League: Air Force
 Midwestern Conference: Michigan State
 Ohio Collegiate Soccer Conference: Akron
 Mason-Dixon Conference: Lynchburg
 Southern California Soccer Association: UCLA
 Middle Atlantic States Athletic Conference: Elizabethtown

Standings

Postseason

NCAA Tournament

Awards

All-Americans 
The following players were named All-Americans following the 1959 season.

 G -  John Santos, Farleigh-Dickinson
 RF - James Gallo, Temple
 LF - Bohdan Huryn, Fenn College
 RH - Peter Hazahiak, Howard
 CH - John Dueker, St. Louis
 LH - Joseph Cosgrove, Baltimore
 OR - James Taylor, Colgate
 IR - Walter Chyzowych, Temple
 CF - Cecil Heron, Michigan State
 IL - Erich Streder, Michigan State
  OL - Adam Pintz, Fenn College

References 

 
NCAA